The men's singles tournament of wheelchair tennis at the 2011 Parapan American Games will be held from November 13 to 16 at the Telcel Tennis Complex in Guadalajara.

Main draw

Finals

Top half

Bottom half

Consolation draw

External links
Draw

Events at the 2011 Parapan American Games